Alvin (DSV-2) is a crewed deep-ocean research submersible owned by the United States Navy and operated by the Woods Hole Oceanographic Institution (WHOI) in Woods Hole, Massachusetts. The vehicle was built by General Mills' Electronics Group in Minneapolis, Minnesota. Named to honor the prime mover and creative inspiration for the vehicle, Allyn Vine, Alvin was commissioned on 5 June 1964. The submersible is launched from the deep submergence support vessel , which is also owned by the U.S. Navy and operated by WHOI. The submersible has made more than 5,000 dives, carrying two scientists and a pilot, to observe the lifeforms that must cope with super-pressures and move about in total darkness, as well as exploring the wreck of Titanic. Research conducted by Alvin has been featured in nearly 2,000 scientific papers.

Design

Alvin was designed as a replacement for bathyscaphes and other less maneuverable oceanographic vehicles. Its more nimble design was made possible in part by the development of syntactic foam, which is buoyant and yet strong enough to serve as a structural material at great depths.

The vessel weighs 17 tons. The submersible features two robotic arms and can be fitted with mission-specific sampling and experimental gear.

In an emergency, if Alvin were stuck underwater with occupants inside, the outer body, or cladding, of the submersible could be released and discarded using controls inside the hull. The titanium sphere would then rise to the surface uncontrolled.

Harold E. Froehlich was one of the principal designers of Alvin.

History

Early career 
Each of the Alvin-class DSVs have different depth capabilities. However Alvin is the only one seconded to the National Oceanic and Atmospheric Administration (NOAA), with the others staying with the United States Navy.

Alvins first deep sea tests took place off Andros Island, the Bahamas, where it made a successful 12-hour, uncrewed tethered  test dive. On 20 July 1965 Alvin made its first  crewed dive for the Navy to obtain certification. On 17 March 1966, Alvin was used to locate a submerged 1.45-megaton hydrogen bomb lost in a United States Air Force midair accident over Palomares, Spain. On 6 July 1967, the Alvin was attacked by a swordfish during dive 202. The swordfish became trapped in the Alvins skin, and the Alvin was forced to make an emergency surface. The fish was recovered at the surface and cooked for dinner. During Dive 209, on 24 September 1968 Alvin found an F6F Hellcat, #42782, 125 miles southeast of Nantucket. The aircraft had ditched 30 September 1944 during carrier qualifications, with the pilot surviving.

Sinking  
 
Alvin, aboard the Navy tender ship Lulu, was lost as it was being transported on 16 October 1968. Lulu, a vessel created from a pair of decommissioned U.S. Navy pontoon boats with a support structure added on, was lowering Alvin over the side when two steel cables snapped. There were three crew members aboard Alvin at the time, and the hatch was open. Situated between the pontoons with no deck underneath, Alvin entered the water and rapidly began to sink.

Severe weather prevented the recovery of Alvin throughout late 1968, but it was photographed at the bottom of the Atlantic Ocean in June 1969 by a sled towed by USS Mizar. Alvin was found to be upright and appeared intact except for damage to the stern. In August 1969, the Aluminaut, a DSV built by Reynolds Metals Company, descended to Alvin but had trouble attaching the required lines, and side effects from Hurricane Camille were producing worsening weather, causing the team to return to Woods Hole to regroup. The second attempt started on 27 August, and Aluminaut was able to secure a line and safety slings on Alvin, and wrapped a prefabricated nylon net around its hull, allowing it to be hauled up by Mizar.

Post-sinking refit 
In 1973, Alvins pressure hull was replaced by a newer titanium pressure hull. The new hull extended the submersible's depth rating.

Mid-Atlantic Ridge
With a new, stronger pressure hull Alvin could now reach the floor of the rift valley of this seafloor spreading center. In the summer of 1974 American and French scientists joined in Project FAMOUS to explore the creation of new sea floor at this spreading center. The French provided submersibles  Archimède  and CYANA. A total of forty-four dives were completed that succeeded in defining the crustal accretion zone in the floor of the rift valley.

Hydrothermal vents

Marine geologists using Alvin in the Pacific Ocean discovered deep-sea hydrothermal vents and associated biologic communities during two expeditions to ocean spreading centers. In 1977 scientists in Alvin discovered low temperature (~20 °C) vents on the Galapagos spreading center east of those same islands. During the RISE expedition in 1979 scientists using Alvin discovered high temperature vents (380 °C) popularly known as ‘black smokers’ on the crest of the East Pacific Rise at 21° N. These discoveries revealed deep-sea ecosystems that exist without sunlight and are based on chemosynthesis.

Exploration of RMS Titanic
Launched from her support ship , she carried Dr. Robert Ballard and two companions to the wreckage of the White Star Liner Titanic, which sank in 1912 after striking an iceberg while crossing the North Atlantic Ocean on her maiden voyage.

Alvin, accompanied by a small remotely operated vehicle (ROV) named Jason Jr., was able to conduct detailed photographic surveys and inspections of Titanics wreckage. Many of the photographs of the expedition have been published in the magazine of the National Geographic Society which was a major sponsor of the expedition.

Alvin obtained photographic and other environmental monitoring data from the remains of Scorpion.

Recent overhauls

Over the years, Alvin has undergone many overhauls to improve its equipment and extend its lifetime. In 2001, among other equipment, motor controllers and computer systems were added. The current Alvin is the same as the original vessel in name and general design only. All components of the vessel, including the frame and personnel sphere, have been replaced at least once: see Ship of Theseus. Alvin is completely disassembled every three to five years for a complete inspection. A new robotic arm was added in 2006.

Recent work
In June 2008 construction started on a stronger and slightly larger personnel sphere which may be used to upgrade Alvin (for use from 2011), before being used in an entirely new vehicle. This, along with a general upgrade of support systems, instruments and materials, will allow Alvin to reach 98% of the ocean floor. After one last dive to assess damage to the Gulf of Mexico's seafloor after the Deepwater Horizon disaster, Alvin was refitted starting January 2011, with an expected return to the ocean in 2012 and full depth potential achieved in 2014.

2014 overhaul
In early 2014, an extensively refitted Alvin started verification testing in the Gulf of Mexico. Featuring new cameras, lighting, and a larger titanium personnel sphere, this new version of Alvin is the result of a three-and-a-half-year effort to upgrade the vessel to increased depth capability. In March and April 2014, Alvin was used to explore the site of the 2010 Deepwater Horizon oil spill.

Current status
As of 2023, Alvin is in active service, operated by the Woods Hole Oceanographic Institution. The research ship RV Atlantis serves as its support ship.

Awards
National Defense Service Medal with 2 stars (3 awards)
Global War on Terrorism Service Medal

Operation 
Like most deep submergence vehicles, Alvin is normally transported on board its support vessel. It is launched  shortly before a dive, and recovered after the dive, using a suitable  (LARS) mounted on the support vessel. The support vessel is usually the R/V Atlantis, but several others have been used.

Alvin uses four  steel weights (~1.7 cubic feet of steel) to provide negative buoyancy for the trip to the ocean floor. Alvin contains a ballast and trim system, but the steel weights allow deep dives to be achieved more rapidly. These weights are jettisoned on each dive and left at the bottom.

See also

Alvin-class DSV

Other deep submergence vehicles

 
 
  (DSV-1)

Notes

References

External links 

 WHOI's Alvin pages

Alvin
Alvin
Alvin
United States submarine accidents
Woods Hole Oceanographic Institution
Research submarines of the United States
1964 ships